KLUI-LP (97.3 FM) was a radio station licensed to serve Kula, Hawaii, United States, which served the Maui area. The station was owned by King's Voice on the Mountain Radio Association.

KLUI-LP's license was returned to the Federal Communications Commission (FCC) by the licensee on October 31, 2013, and cancelled by the FCC on November 5, 2013. 97.3 FM on Maui is now KRKH = K-Rock, "Maui's Rock Station," owned by Hochman Hawaii Publishing, Inc.

References

External links
 

Defunct radio stations in the United States
Radio stations disestablished in 2013
LUI-LP
LUI-LP
Defunct religious radio stations in the United States
2013 disestablishments in Hawaii
LUI-LP